The 2015–16 1. FC Union Berlin season was the 50th season in the football club's history. For the 6th consecutive season, Union Berlin played in the 2. Bundesliga, where they finished 6th. They also participated in this season's edition of the domestic cup, the DFB-Pokal, where they were eliminated in the first round by Viktoria Köln. The season covers a period from 1 July 2015 to 30 June 2016.

Season summary
Union started the season poorly, picking up just four points from their first five games, and as a result, manager Norbert Düwel was sacked on 31 August 2015. Sascha Lewandowski was appointed as his replacement on 2 September 2015, and the club saw a gradual improvement in results, with the club in 13th place with 23 points from 19 games at the time of the winter break. However, due to health problems, Lewandowski stepped down as manager in March 2016, with André Hofschneider appointed as his replacement on a temporary basis. Union finished the season in 6th place on 49 points.

Players

Transfers

Transfers in

Transfers out

Loans in

Loans out

Friendly matches

Competitions

2. Bundesliga

League table

Results summary

Results by round

Matches

DFB-Pokal

Statistics

Appearances and goals

Notes

References

1. FC Union Berlin seasons
Union Berlin, 1. FC